Phacium or Phakion was a town and polis (city-state) of ancient Thessaly, in the district Pelasgiotis. 

Brasidas marched through Phacium in 424 BCE.  In the Second Macedonian War, Livy mentions that it was one of the cities devastated by Philip V of Macedon the year 198 BCE, together with Iresiae, Euhydrium, Eretria and Palaepharsalus, since he foresaw that the territory would soon fall into the hands of the Aetolian League and the Romans. Philip allowed the men who were able to follow him, but they were compelled to quit their homes and the towns were burnt. All the property they could carry with them they were allowed to take away, the rest became the booty for the soldiers. The town was occupied by the Roman praetor Marcus Baebius Tamphilus in the war with Antiochus III in 191 BCE.

The site of Phacium has not been securely located; some scholars suggest a site on left bank of the Peneius river (at Klokotos).

References

Populated places in ancient Thessaly
Former populated places in Greece
Lost ancient cities and towns
Pelasgiotis
Cities in ancient Greece
Thessalian city-states